Kingdom is an anime adaptation of a manga series of the same title written and illustrated by Yasuhisa Hara. On December 15, 2019, it was announced that the series will receive a third season along with a new production staff. The season aired from April 6, 2020 to October 18, 2021. On March 30, 2020, Funimation announced that they will stream the third season in U.S., Canada, the U.K., and Ireland. On April 26, 2020, it was announced that after the fourth episode, the remaining episodes of the season would be delayed until further notice due to the effects of the COVID-19 pandemic. On October 5, 2020, it was announced that weekly new episodes would resume April 5, 2021, starting from episode 1. On August 13th,2022,  Funimation announced at 11:30am pacific time, that the third season of the series would receive an English dub all 26 episodes. 

The opening themes are "TOMORROW" and "STACKiNG" by BiSH while the ending themes are "Deep inside" by Waterweed, and "kIng" by Emiko Suzuki.


Episode list

Notes

References

2020 Japanese television seasons
2021 Japanese television seasons
Kingdom episode lists
Anime postponed due to the COVID-19 pandemic